The ITF Women's Circuit is the second tier tour for women's professional tennis organised by the International Tennis Federation, and is the tier below the WTA Tour. In 2007, the ITF Women's Circuit included tournaments with prize money ranging from $10,000 to $100,000.

The ITF world champions in 2007 were Justine Henin (senior singles), Cara Black / Liezel Huber (senior doubles) and Urszula Radwańska (combined junior ranking).

Tournament breakdown by event category

Tournament breakdown by region

Singles titles by nation

This list displays only the top 21 nations in terms of singles titles wins.

Sources
List of ITF World Champions 
2007 ITF statistics summary
2007 ITF pro circuit singles titles won by nation

References

External links
International Tennis Federation (ITF) official website

 
ITF Women's World Tennis Tour
ITF Circuit
2007 in women's tennis